The 1919 Copa Ibarguren was the 7° edition of this National cup of Argentina. It was played by the champions of both leagues, Primera División and Liga Rosarina de Football crowned during 1919.

Boca Juniors (Primera División champion) faced Rosario Central (Liga Rosarina champion) at Gimnasia y Esgrima de Buenos Aires stadium. Boca Juniors won 1–0 with goal by Miranda.

Qualified teams 

Note

Match details

References

i
i
1919 in Argentine football
1919 in South American football